Restrepo may refer to:

Places
 Restrepo, Bogotá, Colombia
 Restrepo (TransMilenio)
 Restrepo, Meta, Colombia
 Restrepo, Valle del Cauca, Colombia
 Restrepo (Vegadeo), a village in Vegadeo, Spain

Other uses
 Restrepo (film), a 2010 American war documentary
 Restrepo (name), a surname